Orguse may refer to several places in Estonia:

Orguse, Lääne-Viru County, village in Väike-Maarja Parish, Lääne-Viru County
Orguse, Rapla County, village in Juuru Parish, Rapla County